Jiangyuan may refer to:

Places in China
Jiangyuan District (江源区), Baishan, Jilin
Jiangyuan (江源镇), the name of a number of towns
Jiangyuan, Dunhua, Jilin
Jiangyuan, Chongzhou, Sichuan
Jiangyuan, Jianyang, Sichuan

People
Jiang Yuan, legendary ancestress of the dynastic rulers of the Zhou dynasty